The American Sailboat Hall of Fame is a defunct hall of fame honoring 26 production sailboats built-in the United States.  The hall of fame was established in 1994 by Sail America, a trade association for the U.S. sailing industry, to recognize ingenuity in designs by American boat builders.  The last year of induction was 2004.

Half-hull models of each Hall of Fame inductee was housed in a permanent exhibit at The Museum of Yachting located in Fort Adams State Park in Newport, Rhode Island prior to the museum's dismantling after a 2007 acquisition by the IYRS School of Technology & Trades.  The collection also traveled around the country each year to be displayed at the various Strictly Sail boat shows sponsored by Sail America, and at Sail Expo in Atlantic City, New Jersey.

Inducted sailboats were required to be production models built in the U.S. introduced at least 15 years prior to induction, and to have made a lasting impact on sailing.  Selections to the hall of fame were made by a committee composed of magazine editors of Sailing Magazine, Sailing World, and SAIL.

Inductees

See also
National Sailing Hall of Fame
ISAF World Sailor of the Year Awards
List of maritime museums in the United States

Footnotes

References
US Boats Magazine(online) Retrieved 1/7/07
Sail Magazine (online), New Old Boats, Retrieved 1/7/07
Sailing Magazine (online), Full and By, Bill Schanen, Retrieved 1/7/07
 Practical Sailor Magazine, Retrieved 1/7/07
Boat US (online boat review) retrieved 1/7/07
Strictly Sail (website), 15 November 2003,11th Annual Atlantic SAIL EXPO Draws Crowd of 13,000, retrieved 1/7/07
Yahoo Travel retrieved 1/7/07
Rhode Island Tourist Guide (location & contact)
Description of Award - Sail America
 Marston, Red (May 3, 1996). "Kudos to sailboat designer Morgan". St. Petersburg Times, p. 8C.
 Staff. (June 25, 1996). "East Bay Briefings". Providence Journal-Bulletin, p. 3C.

External links
The American Sailboat Hall of Fame
Sail America

Sailing in the United States
Science and technology halls of fame
American science and technology awards
Sailboat
Organizations established in 1994
Maritime museums in Rhode Island
Museums in Newport, Rhode Island
Sailing museums and halls of fame